New Majority (NM), was a Peruvian right-wing political party founded in 1992 for the Democratic Constituent Congress election held on the same year. and throughout the 1990s until late-2000 was the most powerful political party in Peru alongside Cambio 90, serving more as an instrumental electoral vehicle for Alberto Fujimori.

History 
One of the three parties established by Fujimorism during the 1990s, the party ran allied with Cambio 90 for the 1992 Democratic Constituent Congress election and in the 1995 general election. For the 2000 general election, it ran under the Peru 2000 alliance, which grouped Cambio 90 and Vamos Vecino.

During the 2000 elections, Martha Chávez suggested that Fujimori would dissolve Congress if Peru 2000 did not win a majority of seats. She also said that she could not rule out a fourth election of Fujimori, despite the fact that the Constitution of Peru which was written in part by Chávez herself allows presidents to be elected no more than twice in a row. Indeed, Chávez had earlier promised that Fujimori would not run in the 2000 elections. However, Fujimori ran instead.

In the aftermath of Alberto Fujimori's downfall in late-2000, the party participated alongside Cambio 90 at the 2001 general election, only running for Congress.  However, in 2001, during the government of Alejandro Toledo; Luz Salgado and Carmen Lozada were suspended from Congress as there were indications that linked them to crimes of corruption. In 2002, Martha Chávez was suspended indefinitely while the Judiciary investigated her alleged links with corruption, after 3 years, she returned to Congress at the end of 2005, being declared acquitted of the charges for which she was accused and she was compensated the wages not received during their suspension. In 2003, due to the absence of Fujimori and the lack of activity of the other Fujimori parties, Nueva Mayoría separated under the leadership of Martha Chávez. They got it’s registry in 2004. In 2005, Congresswoman Martha Chávez reconvened the party and formally announced her candidacy for the presidency at the 2006 general election, as the electoral authorities rejected Fujimori's ticket with Sí Cumple. Under the Alliance for the Future coalition, New Majority ran alongside Cambio 90. At the presidential race, Chávez placed fourth failing to qualify in the June run-off, while in the congressional election, the congressional list got 13 congressmen out of 120 seats and received the most votes in Pasco.  After the 2006 elections, all of the 13 representatives elected on the Alliance for the Future lists has formed the Parliamentary Fujimorista Group in Congress.

Dissolution 
Following the establishment of Popular Force in 2009 by Fujimori’s daughter Keiko, New Majority ceased to exist in 2012, as their registration was cancelled by the National Jury of Elections for not participating in the 2011 general election. Most of its members ran for office with Popular Force, and ultimately switched their affiliations.

Electoral history

Presidential elections

Elections to the Congress of the Republic

Elections to the Democratic Constituent Congress

References

Conservative parties in Peru
Political parties established in 1992
Defunct political parties in Peru
Fujimorism
Neoliberal parties